Desano is a Tucanoan language of Colombia and Brazil.  There are several alternative names, including Boleka, Desâna, and Kusibi.  It is spoken primarily in northwest Brazil and southern Colombia.

Location

The primary concentration of Desano people is by the Tiquié River in Brazil and Colombia. They also reside near the Papuri River, and their respective tributaries, and on the Uaupés river, which borders Brazil and Columbia, and Negro rivers, as well as in the cities within the area (Cabalzar & Hugh-Jones).

This region is populated by a number of other ethnic communities, most notably the Hup people, with whom they share several linguistic and cultural characteristics.

Characteristics
The Desano language has a 90% lexical similarity with the Siriano language. The language is reported to have a form of whistled speech.

History

The Desano people have faced influence from outsiders when the Spanish and Portuguese explored the region.  These people brought outside illnesses, one being measles, which negatively impacted the surrounding communities.  These explorers also introduced Christianity into the region. The majority of the history of the Desano people is known through traditional stories told by the Desano people. Tukanoan groups suffered greatly at the hands of the Portuguese; from 1739-1760, the Portuguese arrived in the Upper Rio Negro region where they took indigenous people to market them as slaves. According to Wilson de Lima Silva, within this time frame, about 20,000 indigenous people were displaced from their homes and sold as slaves. From 1761-1829, indigenous people continued to be displaced as the Portuguese established new villages for the indigenous people. From this time until 1920 is when the arrival of missionaries was encouraged by a program run by the government called ‘civilização e catequese’ (civilization and conversion). During this time, after being taken away from their communities, indigenous people involuntarily gathered rubber during a time when natural rubber in the Amazon was being taken advantage of.

In 1916, the Salesians came to The Upper Rio Negro region and gradually released the indigenous people from slavery; however, they proceeded to send the indigenous children to boarding school where they were deprived of speaking their native language and only allowed to speak Portuguese. This system resulted in a loss of many cultural traditions and customs. In modern times, many Desano people live in villages and children study in Portuguese at school. As many Desano people no longer reside in their native communities, and children receive education in Portuguese, their native language is left behind.

Study on the Language 
The earliest extensive linguistic study of Desano was conducted by Kaye in 1970. In his study, he systematically covered the semantics, phonetics, and syntax of the language. In his study, Kaye attempts to compare Desano, which he describes as “an undocumented language”, with the syntactic models from Noam Chomsky as an early way to formally document and access the syntactic patterns of Desano. Kaye has also outlined certain phonological features in Desano, namely nasal assimilation, vowel coalescence, and epenthesis. Years later, Chacon (2007) carried out a phonological-comparison project focusing on Tukano and Desano, which are sister languages within the same family. Chacon’s research has taken into consideration certain historical aspects of the land where each of the languages were spoken as an attempt to further study the impact of history on the language’s phonological aspects.

Years later, Silva (2012) carried out and published descriptive grammar research on Desano. Predominantly focusing on morphological rules and patterns, Silva has also outlined certain syntactic patterns of Desano in relation to the historical background of the language community. This includes the noun-classifier and evidentiality systems, outlined by Silva. Silva has also included certain notable phonological features of Desano, namely nasal-harmony, rarely found in other languages and previously studied by Kaye.

Similar in nature, but perhaps slightly different from a language-documentation project, Miller (1999) has conducted in-depth primary experience-based research into Desano by living with the people in Colombia. Her publication focuses mainly on syntactic features of Desano, including but not limited to the issue of verb-compounding, as well as various phonological observations (Miller, 1999). Miller has also included in her publication examples from the boreka pora dialect of the twenty-two dialects documented in Desano, in order to support the syntactic arguments suggested (Miller, 1999).

Phonology 

Extracted from Silva (2012)

Extracted from Silva (2012)

Morphology 
Thorough documentation of Desano morphology is available from various scholars, mainly contributed by Reichel-Dolmatoff (in Portuguese), and Silva (in English). In which, Silva (2012) has offered a detailed account that covers the nominal and the verbal aspects of Desano morphology. Nominal morphology covers noun roots, pronouns, noun phrase (NP) structures, while verbal morphology covers verb roots, verb classes, and verb constructions. In terms of noun roots, Desano has bimoraic nouns that follow certain tonal requirements, such that each word contains at least one high tone. In general, Desano words follow a CVCV structure in terms of consonants and vowels, which is similar to that of Japanese. Desano nouns generally have a masculine-feminine distinction, as demonstrated in its pronoun inventory. Furthermore, its verbs distinguish between ‘animate’ and ‘inanimate’ entities, which is of close relation to the nature. On top of that, it is evident that Desano presents a clear cut between human beings and non human beings in regards to its lexicon, as illustrated by its strict structure of verb class. Desano’s verb class also details in singular or plural, high class or low class animates, and countable and uncountables. Overall, it is clear that Desano follows a clear and strict morphological order, which details from pronunciation to word choice, and from physical to supernatural state.

Pronouns in Desano 
There are two kinds of pronouns in Desano, namely personal pronouns and demonstrative pronouns. Some come with a masculine and feminine distinction in certain classes, similar to that of French or Portuguese.

Personal Pronouns 
Personal pronouns in Desano are somewhat comparable to that of “I, we, you, they, he, she, it” in English, in a sense that there is a distinction between first, second, third person, and also singular or plural subjects.

Silva (2012)

Demonstrative Pronouns 
Demonstrative pronouns are used to “make a distinction between ‘proximal’ and ‘distal’ (Silva 2012), such distinction of proximity could be understood as using ‘this’ or ‘that’ in English, in relation to the distance between the speaker and the object.

Verb Classes 
The two main verb classes of Desano are stative and non-stative. There are five subcategories of stative verbs. Firstly, there is the copula verb /adi/, which is used to describe either temporary or permanent states.. There is also the non-existential verb /badi/, which is used for negation, stating that something does not exist. This can be used in combination with nouns to state the nonexistence of a noun. The third subcategory is the stative possessive, /ohpa/. This verb can be used to express “to have” or “to hold”, and can describe both temporary and permanent states. The fourth subcategory is locative and position verbs. This includes the verb /digi/ ‘be standing’, /bede/  or /duo/ ‘to stay’, and /peya/ ‘to be on top of’. The verb /peya/ appears dependently. Finally, there are descriptive stative verbs, which have the same function of adjectives. In general, Desano uses descriptive stative verbs rather than a separate class of adjectives.

There are four prominent subcategories of non-stative verbs. Firstly, there are active verbs that act as the subject of a clause, started by an active agent. There are transitive, intransitive, and ditransitive variations. The second subcategory is motion verbs, which includes basic motion, directional, and relational. The third subcategory is placement verbs, which occur independently. The fourth subcategory is verbs of perception and mental processes. Verbs of perception can be transitive or intransitive. Some examples are /yɑ̃/ ‘to see’ and /pe/ ‘to hear’. Mental process verbs include beye ‘to explain’ and kẽ ‘to dream’.

Types of Nouns 
Nouns in Desano are categorized by animate, which has subcategories of human and nonhuman, and inanimate, which has subcategories of countable and uncountable. Nouns that are human referents are marked by gender. The singular masculine marker is u/-gu and the singular feminine marker is -o/-go. Some nouns naturally have the gender marking suffix in them, due to an amalgamation of the root of the noun and the gender marking suffix, therefore they are considered to be inherently feminine or masculine.

Extracted from Silva (2012)

Syntax

Case and Agreement 
Desano is hierarchical. Third-person is at the top of the hierarchy, followed by animate, then singular, and lastly, masculine. At the end of declarative sentences in Desano, there are personal endings that are in agreement with the verb’s subject.

Personal endings in Desano (Kaye, 1970, p. 84)

 biN	3rd person, singular, masculine
 boN	3rd person, singular, feminine
 baN	3rd person, plural
 byy	non-3rd person/inanimate

Personal endings in use (1970, p. 84 Kaye)

 jyy waa+by	‘i go’
 byyN waa+by	‘you go’
 igyn waa+biN	‘he goes’
 igo waa+boN	‘she goes’
 gya waa+by	‘we (excl.) go’
 badiN waa+by	‘we (incl.) go’
 byaN waa+by	‘you-all go”
 idaN waa+baN	‘they go’
 wydidu waa+by	‘the airplane goes’

Singular is a feature often given by a base rule. Third-person, animate, and masculine are often thought of as being inherent features of nouns; however, there is some evidence that shows masculine behaves differently than third-person and animate. The evidence supports the claim that it is a feature that is provided grammatically, not inherently a noun feature. The masculine feature in Desano is unmarked, and only given to nouns that are animate-singular.

/abe/ ‘sun, moon’ Desano people would not consider this object to be feminine or masculine, therefore it is unmarked for gender. This means that in cases of agreement, /abe/ will act as a masculine noun. Many nouns which are presented as unmarked for gender will behave as a masculine or feminine noun, with the only indication of gender being the personal verb ending.

Semantics

Tense Systems 
Desano has three tenses, general, non-present, and remote, respectively. According to Kaye (1970), the three tenses are marked with T (general), a (non-present), and R (remote). General tense does not have an embedded timeframe, the time aspect is assumed to be at the time of speech, which is comparable to present and present progressive tense in English. While on the other hand, non-present tense also does not specify a particular time or space, except for the differentiation from the present time and present space where the conversation takes place. In which, the non-present tense could be used to demonstrate various distinct aspects of English at once, meaning it could be used for observed, non-visible, reported, and inferred situations. Lastly, remote tense refers to events that took place or will take place at a relative distance before or from the present time and/or space. Three tenses of Desano uses relative measurement of time and space, which relies heavier on the speaker’s judgement at the time of the conversation.

Examples of general tense, extracted from :

Examples of non-Present tense, extracted from :

Examples of Remote tense, extracted from :

From the examples above, it is evident that the tense marker is clearly visible in the written script. Instead of modifying the target verb like many languages (such as transforming eat to ate for the past tense in English), Desano tense markers come in the form of an additional block after the target verb (illustrated by T, e, and R). Overall, Desano tense works closely with its unique mood system, which also embeds emotion into the written form of the grammar itself.

References 

 
 
 
 
 
 

PROX:proximal
GEN:general tense

Languages of Colombia
Tucanoan languages
Languages of Brazil